Valere is a village in the Torbeck commune of the Les Cayes Arrondissement, in the Sud department of Haiti. Is located 6 kilometers southwest of Torbeck on Route Nationale #2.

References

Populated places in Sud (department)